Caught in the Net is a 1928 Australian silent film about a woman in high society starring Zillah Bateman, a British theatre star who was touring Australia at the time. Only part of the film survives.

Plot
Society girl Phyllis Weston is loved by two men, handsome Jack Stacey and villainous Robson. In a yacht race, Robson tries to sabotage Jack's boat but fails. Robson then tries to get his sister to trap Jack in a comprising situation, but is unsuccessful.

The story includes a yacht race at St Kilda and a rescue from drowning at Portsea.

Cast
Zillah Bateman as Phyllis Weston
John Mayer as Jack Stacey
Charles Brown as Robson
Peggy Farr
Viva Vawden
Felix St H Jellicoe
Beverley Usher

Production
Advance Films had held a competition to find best new Australian story.

The film was shot in early 1928 with exteriors filmed at Portsea.

Release
The film was released as a supporting feature and also was screened in the UK as a quota film.

References

External links

Caught in the Net at National Film and Sound Archive

1928 films
Australian drama films
Australian silent films
Australian black-and-white films
1928 drama films
Silent drama films